The Great Scout & Cathouse Thursday is a 1976 comedy western film directed by Don Taylor starring Lee Marvin, Oliver Reed, Robert Culp, Elizabeth Ashley, Strother Martin, Sylvia Miles, and Kay Lenz.

Plot
Set in Serenity, Colorado, before the 1908 United States presidential election, Sam Longwood, a frontiersman who has seen better days, has finally found after 15 years his ex-business partner Jack Colby, who ran off with all the gold from a mine they were prospecting, and also with the love of his life, Nancy Sue. Sam, along with his two other partners, Indian Joe Knox and Billy, along the way pick up a young prostitute nicknamed Thursday. Getting their money is not going to be as easy as they think.

The trio decide to kidnap Nancy Sue and try to get some ransom money for her return to Jack, but Jack doesn't want her back, and Thursday is cozying up with Sam when he starts to take a shine to her after they spend one night together, now torn between Nancy Sue and Thursday.  The gang asks Thursday to go into town and prostitute herself so they can buy supplies and although her feelings are hurt she does.  In town she sees a man and starts to charm him and he invites her to his hotel room.  After they settle on a price but before they can start he's called from the room.  Alone, Thursday starts going through his things and discovers that he is Jack Colby and she takes his money, leaving an IOU signed in Nancy Sue's name.  In the morning she returns with all the supplies and horses to the gang's hideout.

Cast
 Lee Marvin as Sam Longwood
 Oliver Reed as Joe Knox
 Robert Culp as Jack Colby
 Kay Lenz as Thursday
 Elizabeth Ashley as Nancy Sue
 Sylvia Miles as Madam 'Mike'
 Strother Martin as Billy

Filming
Shooting took place in Durango, Mexico over a 12-week period in late 1974 and early 1975.

Richard Alan Shapiro wrote the novelization.

Reception
Radio Times: "worth watching to witness the battle of wills between Lee Marvin and Oliver Reed, in which the former strains every sinew to stop himself lapsing into caricatured mugging, while the latter tempts him to stray with an exhibition of unabashed showboating"

Dana Jung: "Beginning as an Old West tale of revenge, then sidestepping into bawdy slapstick, and ending as a caper film, the movie is at heart a simple romance that exemplifies the story’s themes of the old guard meeting the new age."

Justin Mory: "The glaring problem with Scout/Thursday is that we as a culture have moved on since 1976, and the production’s edgy R-rated appeal for contemporary audiences will be entirely lost for audiences of today .... What was daringly ‘light and frothy’ for some audiences in the mid-70s has certainly become problematic in the intervening years.

Tom Seltzer, Columbia Missourian: "refreshing, though, in that it does not attempt any deep social meaning. It is light and amusing, and the audience seemed to enjoy it."

References

External links

allmovie
mrqe
tcmdb

1976 films
Films directed by Don Taylor
American comedy films
1976 comedy films
Films scored by John Cameron
American International Pictures films
Films shot in Mexico
1970s English-language films
1970s American films